Cornwall County may refer to:

 Cornwall County, Province of New York, United States
 Cornwall County, Jamaica
 the former name of Cornwall Land District, Tasmania, Australia
 Cornwall, England, UK; a former administrative county, and former countdom
 United Counties of Stormont, Dundas and Glengarry, Ontario, Canada; sometimes called "County of Cornwall"
 Cornouaille, Brittany, France; a former sovereign county, also spelled as "Cornwall"

See also
 Duchy of Cornwall
 Count of Cornouaille (disambiguation)
 Cornwall Township (disambiguation)
 Cornwall (disambiguation)
 Kernow (disambiguation)

County name disambiguation pages